Abbasabad-e Piazi (also Romanized as ‘Abbāsābād-e Pīāzī; also known as ‘Abbāsābād, ‘Abbāsābād-e Bard ‘Alī, and ‘Abbāsābād-e Zarand) is a village in Hakimabad Rural District, in the Central District of Zarandieh County, Markazi Province, Iran. At the 2006 census, its population was 303, in 75 families.

The word Piaz means Onion in Persian. People in this village are mostly farmer. This village has around 600 hectare of farms and gardens. The most well-known products of this village are: Persian melon, melon, grape, pomegranate, apricot, various types of plums, potato and of course Onion which is rooted in village's name. Since the village is not far from metropolises such as Tehran, Karaj and Arak many of inhabitants who migrated to these big cities have their own houses in village and come for spending weekends and summer holidays.

References 

Populated places in Zarandieh County